Thysanotus scaber is a herbaceous perennial flowering plant with tall stems accompanied with a cluster of foliage underneath. This plant is endemic to the Southwest Australia. The flowers of this plant are bright mauve and there are 3 petals each decorated with fringed edges.

Distribution
Thysanotus scaber originates from Southwestern Australia, East of Perth. It is considered to distributed in the IBRA regions, Jarrah Forest and the Swan Coastal Plain. The Government of Western Australia's Department of Environment and Conservation considers the plants conservation code to be, "not threatened".

Habitat and ecology
Thysanotus scaber flourishes is a dry climate with low humidity.  This plant grows in a region that has a Mediterranean climate with wet winters and dry summers. The native environment of the plant is Eucalypt woodlands. Thysanotus scaber is able to grow in soil that has excellent drainage, but is also able to grow in more sandy soil. However, if the soil is too fine, it may cause the roots to rot.

Morphology
Thysanotus scaber is monoecious and is attached to the ground by tuberous roots. Its leaves are usually thin and grass like. The inflorescence tends to be raceme or panicle with bisexual flowers. This plant is usually distinguished by its few, erect, rough textured leaves. Each flower usually contains 6 stamens with the inner stamens usually reduced. This species has short filaments and stigmas. There are 3 ovaries each with 2 ovules.

Fruits and seeds
Fruits are seen as capsules and longitudinally dehiscent along the capsule wall. The seeds are spherical and black.

References

Lomandroideae
Asparagales of Australia